The Afterimage was a Canadian progressive metalcore band from Barrie, Ontario. The band formed in 2011 with members from local bands such as Centuries Apart and The Prologue--vocalist Kyle Anderson, guitarists Alex Lappano and Mike Ticar, drummer Nick McCaslin, and bassist Dallas Bricker.

History

Formless
On May 24, 2012, The Afterimage released their debut single titled "Void"  from their first EP Formless which was released in North America through Famined Records on August 14, 2012, and Ghost Music in the UK. This EP was received very well as it showcased the band's creativity and talent in four tracks.

Following the release of Formless, The Afterimage hit the road and spent August 2012 touring Eastern Canada with Ascariasis and Stormwalker. It was on this tour that the band met Ascariasis guitarist Michael Leo Valeri, who would join the band the following year. The band was able to land a slot at the KOI Music Festival in Kitchener, Ontario in September. From October 20-November 5 the band went on another Canadian tour, this time with labelmates Three Crowns. Famined then released a free 4th of July Summer Sampler, with songs from the two bands. 

In 2013, the band released three singles: "Pathogen", "Unseen" and "The Seeking". The Afterimage toured across Canada in 2013 with Beheading of a King and Take the Earth Beneath Us from February 21 to March 16.

The Afterimage then signed with Royal Division Entertainment and released the single "O N Y X" on April 13, 2014.

Lumière
On August 28, 2015, The Afterimage released their eight-track EP Lumière  through Tragic Hero Records. The band's new song  "Reach" was featured on Guitar World with a play-through video. During September 4–20, The Afterimage toured with ERRA, Polyphia, and Invent, Animate. The new EP was engineered by Valeriote at Sundown Studios and Nick Sampson at Metro 37 Studios and mixed and mastered by Kris Crummett at Interlace Audio.

Eve 
In May 2018, The Afterimage released their debut album, Eve. In June, they headlined a 10-band concert in Ottawa.

Break-Up
The band announced their break-up via social media on September 22, 2018. It was later revealed that they were no longer with Tragic Hero, and had rebranded to become the technical deathcore act 'Brand of Sacrifice'.

Style
The Afterimage incorporated elements of melody, chaos, technicality, and groove in their music. They had extremely detailed guitar riffs and technical breakdowns and pleasant-sounding bridges that created their distinct brand of metalcore. Their use of clean vocals is apparent on nearly every track on Lumière. The Afterimage was influenced by Meshuggah, The Tony Danza Tapdance Extravaganza, Dance Gavin Dance, The 1975 and Tesseract.

Discography
Singles
 The Seeking (2012)
 Pathogen (2013)
 Unseen (2013)
 O N Y X (2014)
 Pursue (2017)
 Cerulean (2018)

Albums

Members

Final Lineup
 Kyle Anderson – vocals (2012–2018)
 Michael Leo Valeri – guitars (2013–2015, 2018)
 Liam Beeson – guitars (2017–2018)
 Dallas Bricker– bass guitar (2012–2018)
 Robert Zalischi – drums (2013–2018)

Former members
 Asher Ally  – guitars (2016–2018)
 Samuel Jacobs  – guitars (2013–2015)
 Alex Lappano – guitars (2012–2013)
 Michael Ticar – guitars (2012–2013)
 Andrew Wilson – guitars (2013–2013)
 Nick McCaslin – drums (2012–2013)

References

Canadian heavy metal musical groups
Musical groups established in 2011
Musical groups disestablished in 2018
Musical groups from Barrie
Tragic Hero Records artists
2011 establishments in Ontario
2018 disestablishments in Ontario